Pelan, also Pellan, is a rare surname with independent origins. The name has also been lent to subjects directly or indirectly associated with individuals bearing that surname.
The three geographical origins of the surname are France, Ireland and Eastern Europe.

In Ireland, Pelan  thought to be a variant or corruption of the common surname Phelan and is found largely in Northern Ireland, and historically in County Down and County Antrim. There are also theories that it is of Huguenot origin and/or possibly related to the Breton surname Pellan .

In Eastern Europe, Pelan is a Czech or Slovakian surname (sometimes written as Pelán).

This surname has spread to adjacent geographical areas and also to the New World with widespread migration in the 19th century.

People 
 John Pelan (1957–2021), American author, editor and publisher
 Alfred Pellan, (1906–1988), Canadian painter

Associated uses 
 Pelan Township, Kittson County, Minnesota, settled in 1880 by Charles Pelan from England.
 Pelan, Minnesota, ghost town in Kittson County, Minnesota
 Alfred-Pellan, federal electoral district in Quebec, Canada

External links
 The Pelan Monument, Lambeg Churchyard, Lambeg, Northern Ireland
 "The Life of Samuel Pelan", letter from 1851.
 Study of the surname Pellan (in French), suggested links with Pelan.
 Chateau Pelan wine from Bordeaux.
 NRCS Soil Series description.
 Pelan Y-DNA Surname Project

Surnames
Breton-language surnames